As a fictional character and the archenemy of Batman, the Joker has been represented in a variety of different stories that redefine elements of the character's appearance and personality. Each work typically establishes its own continuity, and sometimes introduces parallel universes, to the point where distinct differences in the portrayal of the character can be identified. This article details various versions of the Joker depicted in works including alternative universe stories.

Possible futures

Batman: Digital Justice
In the 1990 graphic novel Batman: Digital Justice created by Pepe Moreno, an artificial intelligence calling itself the "Joker Virus" takes over a futuristic, technology-dependent Gotham City in the late 21st century and claims to be the reincarnation of its creator, the original Joker. Batman, in this version the grandson of Commissioner James W. Gordon, stops the virus with help from another A.I.: the Batcomputer, as programmed by the long-dead Bruce Wayne.

Dark Knight universe

 In the alternative future of The Dark Knight Returns (1986), the Joker has been catatonic since Batman's retirement but regains consciousness after seeing a news story about his nemesis' reemergence. He manipulates his psychiatrist into declaring him cured, and hires a publicist to book him on a late night talk show. He then embarks on a killing spree, drawing Batman out into the open. Batman pursues him into the Tunnel of Love at a carnival, where he fractures the Joker's neck in a fit of rage, but cannot bring himself to kill his old foe. The Joker then commits suicide by twisting his fractured neck until it breaks completely, thus framing Batman as a murderer. His body is soon found by the police before it abruptly bursts into flame, Batman having rigged the corpse to create a distraction. 
 In The Dark Knight Strikes Again (2001), the sequel to The Dark Knight Returns, a man resembling the Joker with supernatural powers and a healing factor kills numerous superheroes under orders from Lex Luthor to foil Batman's superhero revolution against Luthor's dictatorial regime. Despite his appearance, several heroes insist that he cannot be the deceased Joker. In the climax, he is revealed to be Dick Grayson, who had been fired and abandoned by Batman many years ago. Grayson targeted Batman's partner Carrie Kelley specifically because of his jealousy of the girl. Grayson's disguise as the Joker is shown to have been a ploy to taunt Batman emotionally before taking his revenge. Dick is killed after a final confrontation with Batman.
 In All Star Batman and Robin the Boy Wonder, the prequel to The Dark Knight Returns (1986), the Joker is revealed to be the man responsible for the death of Grayson's parents, having hired "Jocko-Boy" Vanzetti to murder them during a circus act.
 In the one-shot Dark Knight Returns: The Last Crusade, the Joker is revealed to be responsible for the death of Jason Todd, by having ordered his men to brutally beat the new Robin to death in retaliation of his last defeat by the Dynamic Duo.
In Dark Knight Returns: The Golden Child (2019), the sequel to The Dark Knight III: The Master Race, another Joker is seen working alongside Darkseid and campaigning to be President of the United States while his henchmen cause chaos in the streets of Gotham before he is defeated by Carrie Kelley as Batwoman. While the identity of this Joker is never revealed in story, the character notes in the deluxe edition of the comic by the artist, Rafael Grampá, for the character seems to suggest that the Joker who appears in The Golden Child is in fact the original Joker from The Dark Knight Returns, and that Frank Miller didn't want to explain how or why the Joker was alive again after his death, as such Grampá explains in the character notes he decided to draw the Joker to look as if he had plastic surgery "Since the last time we saw him in the Dark Knight saga, where he was burnt!"

Flashpoint
In the alternate timeline of the Flashpoint event, Martha Wayne is the Joker (and even resembles Heath Ledger's portrayal as seen in The Dark Knight). After Bruce Wayne is shot and killed by Joe Chill, Martha is unable to cope with her loss, so she cuts open her cheeks to create a faux smile.

As the Joker, she is the nemesis of Batman and uses Yo-Yo as a henchman. She kidnaps Harvey Dent's son and daughter. The Joker kills James Gordon after she tricks Gordon into shooting Harvey's daughter (disguised as the Joker). After Dent's son and daughter are saved, Batman confronts the Joker about their son's death. As Batman has recently met Barry Allen, Martha learns that there is a way to rewrite history where Bruce will live, although they will die. Realizing that her son will be Batman in that timeline, Martha flees in horror, falling to her death in the caverns below Wayne Manor.

Alternative universes

The DC Multiverse contains numerous parallel universes, which in turn contain parallel Earths and alternative versions of DC characters that are different from the mainstream DC continuity.

Earth-Two
Joker's history on Earth-Two is the same as his Golden Age history.

King Kull later recruited Joker of Earth-Two to assist Weeper II of Earth-S, Doctor Light of Earth-One, and Shade of Earth-One in order to trap one side of Earth-S in darkness. Joker did show Weeper how he commits his crimes on Earth-Two. Their plot was defeated by Batman and Robin of Earth-Two, Mr. Scarlet and Pinky the Whiz Kid of Earth-S, and Hawkman and Hawkgirl of Earth-One.

After Batman had died from terminal cancer, Joker refused to believe that his archenemy is dead. Dick Grayson posed as Batman to mesmerize Joker enough for Huntress to apprehend him.

When Nicholas Lucien came out of a coma following his last fight with Batman, he found himself incarcerated at Gotham State Penitentiary where Joker became his cellmate. Lucien planned to have his revenge on Batman only to be told by Joker that Batman is dead.

Earth-2
The Joker of the Post-52 Earth-2 is depicted as an old man, frail and wheelchair-reliant after a lifetime of exposure to deadly chemicals, and ironically unable to laugh without hurting himself. After disfiguring the Huntress's boyfriend, Harry Simms, in an attempt to create a replacement for the deceased Two-Face, he is tracked down by the vengeful heroine. The Joker attempts to kill the Huntress with a lethal joy buzzer, but the attack is intercepted by Power Girl, and the Joker is himself electrocuted as a result.

Earth-3
The Joker of Earth-3 is a hero operating under the alias of the Jokester, and first appeared in Countdown #32 (Sep 2007). He is the nemesis of Owlman, a villainous version of Batman. Jokester and his daughter Duela Dent are killed by the rogue Monitor Solomon.

Earth-9
The Joker of Earth-9 in the DC Comics imprint Tangent Comics is a female hero who uses her array of jokes and comical devices to mock the evil tyrant Superman's authority. She first appears in Tangent Comics/The Joker #1 (Dec. 1997). This Joker is actually three women: student Mary Marvel, entrepreneur Christie Xanadu, and reporter Lori Lemaris, all of whom take turns wearing the Joker costume. Mary is captured by the Tangent Superman and tortured into revealing the identities of the other two before she is killed. Lemaris is sent to prison and Christina's fate is left unknown. Lemaris is later re-offered the Joker mantle, but instead chooses to take up that of her fallen comrade, Manhunter.

Earth-16
On this alternate Earth, the children of metahuman heroes and villains have been forced into apparent retirement due to the efficiency of Superman robots. Amongst these individuals is Duela Dent/the Joker's Daughter, friends with Alexis Luthor, daughter of Lex Luthor.

Earth-23
In the timeline of Batman: The Brave and the Bold, set outside the DC animated universe, the character operates as the hero the Red Hood, escaping the clutches of the villainous Batman counterpart, Owlman.

Superman/Batman (2008)
A "Super deformed" version of the Justice League of America and some villains (the Joker among them) appeared in Superman/Batman #51 and #52. In Grant Morrison's 2014–15 miniseries The Multiversity, this alternate Earth is given the designation Earth-42.

Earth 2
In 2011, "The New 52" rebooted the DC continuity. On Earth 2, Joker is a dangerous criminal who is imprisoned in a stasis chamber at Arkham Base. When Batman entered Arkham base to look for inmates to aid him, he shot Joker in the head.

Batman: Earth One
The Joker is introduced towards the end of Volume Three of the graphic novel series Batman: Earth One. In this version, he is suggested to be the one responsible for the Flying Graysons' demise, and frees Toyman from police custody in order to enlist him for his future plans.

Elseworlds

Elseworlds titles are stories that take place in their own separate continuities and often feature different interpretations of mainstream continuity characters.

Batman: Bloodstorm (1994)
In Batman: Bloodstorm, a sequel to Batman & Dracula: Red Rain, the Joker becomes the leader of a group of vampires after the death of their original leader, Dracula. Although he successfully coordinates their efforts to take control of Gotham's major crime families, the now-vampire Batman aided by were-cat Selina Kyle is able to destroy the Joker's minions. Unfortunately, Selina is killed in the final battle with the Joker's vampires, with her death causing Batman to succumb to his lust for blood and drink from the Joker. Although he stakes his foe to prevent him from coming back as a vampire, Batman is left tormented by the knowledge that the Joker won their long conflict by driving him to kill, often reflecting that he is damned by Dracula's bite and the Joker's blood in equal measure as he surrenders to his vampire side and turns on his old enemies.

Batman: In Darkest Knight (1994)
In Batman: In Darkest Knight, a Joker/Two-Face analog character is created when Sinestro absorbs the mind of Joe Chill, driving him insane and resulting in his taking on Joker's iconic purple suit and warped sense of humor (as well as a state resembling multiple personality disorder). The classic Joker origin (as depicted in The Killing Joke) is referenced, but averted by Green Lantern Bruce Wayne; after being arrested, the Red Hood says he has "had a really bad day", and Bruce counters by saying that that is no excuse, because everyone has terrible days, which shames the Hood into apologizing.

Batman: Leatherwing (1994)
In Batman: Leatherwing, the Joker is represented as the "Laughing Man", the deformed and insane pirate captain of the ship Pescador. He is the adversary of Captain Leatherwing, a Batman analogue.

Batman: Nosferatu (1999)
In Batman: Nosferatu, the Joker appears as the Laughing Man, a monstrous cyborg created by the experiments of the depraved Dr. Arkham, who uses him as an assassin. This version of the Joker ironically ends up creating this world's Batman after an assassination attempt on Bruce Wayne's counterpart.

Batman: Two Faces (1998)
In Batman: Two Faces, the Joker is not an independent entity, but a shared identity created when a potion created by Bruce Wayne to give himself superhuman strength also creates a new personality, Bruce alternating randomly between himself and the Joker, his Batman identity fighting crime, while the Joker commits murders. After he realizes the truth and confesses to his allies, Bruce, unable to cure himself, allows himself to fall off a building to stop the Joker once and for all.

Gotham by Gaslight (1989)
The Joker cameos in Gotham by Gaslight as a serial killer who, having married and poisoned at least 10 women, tries to commit suicide with strychnine when he is caught, leaving him with a permanent grin.

JLA: The Nail (1998)
In JLA: The Nail, the Joker is provided with Kryptonian gauntlets and launches an attack on Arkham Asylum, forcing most of the inmates to fight each other before brutally murdering Batgirl and Robin while forcing Batman to watch. Catwoman distracts Joker long enough for Batman to escape, but the traumatised Batman subsequently kills the Joker in a rage. During JLA: Another Nail (2004), Batman encounters the Joker in the afterlife when dimensional anomalies allow him to escape from Hell, briefly attempting to sacrifice himself to ensure that the Joker will remain trapped, but Robin and Batgirl's spirit halts Batman's attempted sacrifice and gives him the strength to move on from his guilt.

Superman & Batman: Generations (1999)
In the Superman & Batman: Generations miniseries, the DC characters are shown to age at a normal rate, with Batman and Superman beginning their careers in 1939.  In 1949, the Joker and Lex Luthor kidnap a pregnant Lois Lane and expose her to gold kryptonite; this renders her first-born child a normal human. In 1969, the now-elderly Joker secretly escapes Arkham Asylum and poses as 'Joker Junior', claiming to be the original's protégé. The Joker kills the second Batman (an adult Dick Grayson) before revealing his true identity to the police as he gloats about how he has finally killed Batman, but Bruce Junior, Bruce Wayne's son and Grayson's Robin, manages to switch costumes with his mentor to create the impression that the Joker killed Robin rather than Batman.  In 1975, Grayson's spirit attacks the Joker in an attempt to kill him, but the spirit of the deceased Alfred Pennyworth convinces Grayson to pass on as the Joker can be no threat to anyone. Learning that his enemy is about to die of old age, the now-retired Bruce Wayne dons the cape and cowl for a final visit to the Joker's deathbed. Batman rejects the Joker's request to learn his true identity, on the grounds that the Joker is the last man that he would want to bring peace to.

Superman: Speeding Bullets (1993)
This Elseworlds story Superman: Speeding Bullets is set on an Earth where baby Kal-El was adopted by Thomas and Martha Wayne and raised as Bruce Wayne. When Bruce's parents are killed, he becomes the ruthless vigilante Batman. Batman's nemesis is Lex Luthor who, in this reality, was injured in the same type of chemical accident that created the main universe Joker. The accident also drives Luthor insane, and he attempts to destroy Gotham City with an army of thugs, but is stopped by Batman.

Thrillkiller and Thrillkiller '62
In the Elseworlds miniseries Batman: Thrillkiller (Jan.-March 1997), the Joker is gangster Bianca Steeplechase, and the nemesis of Batgirl and Robin. Steeplechase poisons Robin, masquerades as the mayor's wife, abducts and tortures Bruce Wayne, and is in a lesbian relationship with Earth-37's Harley Quinn. Bianca is killed by Batgirl, drowning in the Gotham River.

Batman: Damned
In the miniseries Batman: Damned, printed under the DC Black Label, the Joker's death is the center of the story. The circumstances are left unclear, though it occurred after a confrontation with Batman led to both of them tumbling over a bridge. The Joker's body is later discovered by police, having washed up on shore, while Batman is severely injured and disoriented. Harley Quinn snaps completely and performs surgery on herself to resemble the Joker, before leading his henchmen on a revenge mission.

Other

Amalgam Comics
Amalgam Comics is a 1997–98 shared imprint of DC Comics and Marvel Comics, which features characters that are composites of DC and Marvel characters. The Hyena (Creed H. Quinn) is a composite of DC's Joker and Marvel's Sabretooth. He is the nemesis of the Dark Claw (Logan Wayne), a composite of Batman and Marvel's Wolverine. Hyena, like Wayne, is a mutant with the ability to rapidly heal injuries. The two were both subjects of the Weapon X program, an attempt to create "living weapons". Hyena used his enhancements to become a psychopathic killer. The Hyena first appeared in Legends of the Dark Claw #1 (April 1996).

Batman Beyond
In the timeline of Batman Beyond, set in the DC animated universe after the events of the film Batman Beyond: Return of the Joker, the Joker remains deceased. In the Justice League Beyond arc "Flashdrive" his corpse appears in a flashback, set immediately after his death at the hands of Tim Drake in Return of the Joker, being buried beneath Arkham Asylum by Batman and James Gordon. The Joker's death is shown to be the catalyst for Barbara Gordon's retirement as Batgirl besides Drake's eventual retirement as Robin.

Batman/Judge Dredd
Batman/Judge Dredd featured the Joker character as a member of the Dark Judges, in the original miniseries Batman and Judge Dredd: Die Laughing #1–2 (1998). The Joker helped free the original Dark Judges in exchange for immortality. He received his payment by having his spirit merged into a corpse (which was not quite the "immortality" he had sought), creating "Judge Joker". As a Dark Judge, the Joker could kill masses of people with his laugh, which caused human heads to explode.

His tenure was a brief one, as he quickly became bored with slaughter simply for its own sake and did not share the original Dark Judges' fanatical zeal for their "sacred mission" of purging all life. The Joker was restored to his normal, mortal form upon returning to Gotham City via a defective dimensional jump device.

Batman: White Knight

In this alternate reality, the Joker mocks Batman's attitude towards his "crusade" for justice, claiming that Batman's actions amount to nothing but an attempt to control his world and the Joker simply gives him the opportunity to express this rage. Disgusted at this claim, Batman force-feeds the Joker a bottle of pills that the villain had just stolen, but the overdose has the unexpected side effect of restoring the Joker to sanity, as well as remembering his former identity of Jack Napier, prompting him to "order" the GCPD to either charge Batman for assault, or he would sue the department for complicity in Batman's abuse of prisoners. Napier's case against the department continues as he states that the GCPD locked him up as a major criminal on minimal evidence, and even finds himself reforming Harley Quinn as he reveals that he drove the true Doctor Harleen Quinzell away a long time ago and the Harley he has been working with was another madwoman. He reinforces his vendetta against Batman by discovering records of the cost of building insurance to compensate for all the damage caused by Batman's actions, as well as taking control of several other villains by adapting the technology used by the Mad Hatter to take control of Clayface and then expose the others to samples of Clayface, allowing him to control them by proxy.

The Batman Who Laughs

On Earth-Minus-22 of the Dark Multiverse, the Joker discovers Batman's secret identity. He slaughters most of Batman's other rogues, as well as Commissioner Gordon, and then infects a sizeable portion of Gotham's population with the same chemicals that transformed him, subsequently killing several parents in front of their children with the goal of creating a gathering of children that were essentially a combination of himself and Batman. As Batman grapples with the Joker, the Joker finally dies from the chemicals that had originally transformed him. As he dies, his decaying body infects Batman with a virus that gradually transforms him into a new Joker. By the time the Batman realizes this, the process is too advanced for him to find a cure. Batman kills most of his allies and transforms Damian into a mini-Joker before turning on the rest of the Justice League and then conquering the world. Although the Batman Who Laughs successfully leads the other Dark Knights in a large-scale assault on the prime DC Universe on behalf of Barbatos, he is finally defeated by Batman and the Joker of the prime Earth. The Joker mockingly notes that even an insane Batman can only plan for scenarios that he believes are possible, and an alliance between the Joker and the Batman is the one thing the Batman Who Laughs could never have considered.

Captain Carrot and His Amazing Zoo Crew
The 1980s series Captain Carrot and His Amazing Zoo Crew presented the parallel Earth of "Earth-C", a world populated by talking animal superheroes. Captain Carrot, in his secret identity of Roger Rodney Rabbit, is the creator of the superhero comic Just'a Lotta Animals (a cartoon-animal version of the Justice League of America). Captain Carrot and the Zoo eventually discover the characters in Rodney's comics actually live on "Earth-C-Minus", in yet another alternate universe. There, the Porker, a pig analog of the Joker, is the nemesis of the Batmouse. A poster of the Porker (drawn in a style resembling Alex Ross's version of the Joker) is later seen at a comic book convention on Earth-C.

Injustice: Gods Among Us comic
In this spin-off of the online game, the Joker tires of his unsuccessful fight with Batman, and decides to attack Superman. He and Harley Quinn kill Jimmy Olsen and abduct Lois Lane (who is pregnant with Superman's child).  They place a stolen nuclear warhead within Metropolis with a deadman switch wired to Lois. After exposing Superman to kryptonite-laced fear toxin (stolen from the Scarecrow), Superman mistakes Lois for Doomsday and kills her. Metropolis is destroyed in the subsequent nuclear detonation. A grief-stricken and vengeful Superman confronts the captured Joker, who states that he will just escape to commit more crimes and taunts Superman about not finding love and happiness again, saying he will take it again from him. Enraged beyond words, Superman kills the Joker and establishes the Regime, intent on eliminating crime through any means necessary.

In the Year Three comic series, Superman is placed into a magical sleep where he imagines events playing out differently. He is able to break free of the fear toxin in time to save Lois, their child, and Metropolis. Before an angry Superman can attack the Joker, Batman takes the Joker away. When the Joker confesses to Batman that he would try to kill Lois again, Batman kills the Joker and is imprisoned as a result. With the tragedy averted, Superman is able to live a happy life with his wife and child. Superman is eventually woken from his dream and forced to contend with a world where the Joker bested him much to his agonizing fury.

In Year Four it is revealed that the Joker's name is used by the Joker Underground, a large group of people who oppose Superman's Regime and see the Joker as a symbol of freedom.  This catches Batwoman and Harley Quinn's eyes and they convince the protestors to use a different system. The Underground agree, but shortly after the two depart an enraged Superman shows up, furious they are using the Joker as a symbol. He then kills the Underground, including over 200 people, as punishment. This results in others continuing to use the Joker's name as a symbol, in response to the fact that Superman showed he is willing to murder those who had already agreed to stop using the Joker's name as their symbol, resulting in the Underground being temporarily co-opted by the Joker of an alternate universe.

Joker (2008)
Another graphic novel, called simply Joker, focuses on the character in a more gritty, realistic version of the Batman mythos.

The People's Joker

A 2022 film from Vera Drew, starring a version of The Joker.

Planetary/Batman
Planetary/Batman presents the Joker as a field agent for Planetary named Jasper, working under Richard Grayson. He is apparently harmless and has a habit of giggling when he is nervous. Elijah Snow mentions not liking the way Jasper "kept hugging himself" when looking at pictures of homicides.

Smallville
In a comic book miniseries based on the television series Smallville, an interpretation of the Joker made his debut in Smallville: Alien #3 (February 2014). He is the Earth-13 version of Batman and incorporates an element of the Crime Syndicate/Society character, Owlman in addition to pale skin and green hair of Joker.

Batman/Teenage Mutant Ninja Turtles
During Batman/Teenage Mutant Ninja Turtles the Joker is first seen mocking one of Arkham's psychiatrists, earning him a dose of medication. The Joker is also mutated into a king cobra. Despite almost killing Batman, he is quickly knocked out by Donatello.

DC/Marvel crossovers
 In the 1981 story Batman and the Incredible Hulk: The Monster and the Madman, the Shaper of Worlds loses control of his powers after passing through a unique field of radiation. He makes contact with the Joker to steal gamma ray equipment from Wayne Enterprises that can treat his condition. Despite the intervention of the Hulk, the Joker manages to escape with the equipment by tricking the Hulk into fighting Batman. The stolen ray proves ineffective, but exposure to the Hulk's unique gamma radiation cures the Shaper instead. As part of a deal with the Joker, the Shaper agrees to make the Joker's dreams real, but Batman and the Hulk are able to trick him into overloading his ability to dream.
 Carnage teams up with the Joker in Spider-Man and Batman: Disordered Minds #1 (1995).  The two meet when behavioral psychiatrist Cassandra Briar attempts to use the two killers as tests for a chip that will "lobotomise" their homicidal instincts. The Carnage symbiote neutralizes Kasady's chip after it is implanted, with Kasady pretending that the chip had worked so that he could meet the Joker. After Carnage removes the Joker's chip, the two's mutual psychoses lead them into a brief alliance before their differing methods of murder cause a clash; Carnage favors numbers and actually seeing the death of his victims of his murder sprees close-up, while the Joker prefers the artistry of his usual traps and tricks, Carnage dismissing the Joker's methods as slow, while Joker sees Carnage as an amateur as anyone can just go out and kill people. The Joker tries to kill Carnage with a bomb, but Carnage drapes a piece of symbiote over a corpse to fake his death. Batman and Spider-Man uncover the trick, and Batman is subsequently engulfed in Carnage's symbiote tendrils. Carnage proposes to kill Batman, but the Joker threatens to set off a bomb to destroy Gotham, himself and Carnage, rather than see Carnage kill Batman. As Batman battles Carnage, Spider-Man follows the Joker. The Joker defiantly dares Spider-Man to kill him, however, Spider-Man is unable to stoop to his level, electing instead to apprehend the Joker in classic hero style.
 In the 1997 DC/Marvel special Batman/Captain America, the Red Skull hires the Joker to steal an atomic bomb during World War II. Joker evades Batman, Cap, Bucky, and Robin and delivers it to the Skull, but is horrified when he learns that the Skull is a Nazi (saying "I may be a criminal lunatic but I'm an American criminal lunatic!"). When the Skull threatens to drop the bomb on Washington D.C., the Joker attacks him in the plane's cargo bay. While Captain America and Batman fly the plane over the ocean, the two villains are dropped out with the bomb just before it explodes. Both Captain America and Batman are convinced that the two are still alive somehow.

References

External links

 Why So Serious? – The Many Faces of Joker
 The Origin of Joker at DCComics.com
 

Characters created by Bill Finger
Characters created by Bob Kane
Characters created by Jerry Robinson
DC Comics titles
Fictional characters from parallel universes
Alternative versions of comics characters
Golden Age supervillains
Alternative versions